Gunnar Brøvig (8 June 1924– 7 October 1965) was a Norwegian politician for the Labour Party.

He served as a deputy representative to the Norwegian Parliament from Vest-Agder during the term 1961–1965.

References

1924 births
1965 deaths
Deputy members of the Storting
Labour Party (Norway) politicians
Vest-Agder politicians